Iririki is a privately leased island, located in Mele Bay, near Port Vila, the Capital of Vanuatu. The island is owned and operated by Australian businessmen Shane Pettiona, Darren Pettiona and Peter Stockley.

Current usage 

Iririki Island Resort continues to operate as a resort.

History
Iririki Island is the traditional land of Ifira Islanders.
1910 – The first British Hospital in the New Hebrides was established on Iririki Island in memory of the well-known Presbyterian missionary John G Paton.  Patients were seen for such ailments as broken bones, meningitis, and rheumatic fever, and Pacific islanders were trained in tropical disease management. 
1913 – Iririki Island housed the British Residency who leased the island from missionaries for 99 years. The Residency was located at the peak of Iririki (reached by climbing 179 steps) affording it magnificent views to Port Vila and the surrounding bay. The original household was built for the Queen for an overnight visit, and subsequently accommodated the British High Commissioner. 
1980 – On independence, the residence was abandoned although is currently in use.
1983 – After consideration by the Ifira Islanders, they leased the Island to Peter Nicholson to construct it into a resort.
1987 – Cyclone Uma hit Iririki Island and Port Vila with  winds and flooding, with the resort taking up a year to return to full operation.
1991 – Former Geelong AFL player Rick and Ngaire Graham took over Iririki as owners, turning the resort into a child-free sanctuary.
2004 – The Resort was sold to a private consortium of Australian businessmen.
2009 – Policy changed to a family friendly resort.
The resort was relaunched in May 2016.

Language
Bislama is the official language. In addition, English and French are also widespread. Other Indigenous languages are also spoken in the city.

Climate
Port Vila has a tropical climate, with little variance in temperature throughout the year. The region also enjoys southeast trade winds. Months of November to February are generally warm and humid, with April to October displaying optimal weather conditions.

Geography 
Iririki island is an island off the coast of Port Vila, Vanuatu. It offers blue Pacific Ocean waters, tropical climates, tropical landscape such as Arecaceae trees and white sandy beaches.

References
 Freeman, T.E.A., (2006), Doctor in Vanuatu: A Memoir, Institute of Pacific Studies
 Rodman, M.R., (2001), Houses Far From Home: British Colonial Space in the New Hebrides, University of Hawai'i Press, Honolulu, USA. 

Islands of Vanuatu
Private islands of Oceania
Shefa Province
Resorts in Vanuatu
Hotels in Vanuatu